Margaret of Hungary (Margit in Hungarian; born 1175, living 1223) was a Byzantine Empress by marriage to Isaac II Angelos and Queen of Thessalonica by marriage to Boniface of Montferrat. She was regent of Thessalonica during the minority of her son Demetrius of Montferrat in 1207–1216.

Early life

Margaret was the eldest daughter of Béla III of Hungary and his first wife Agnes of Antioch. She was a younger sister of Emeric, King of Hungary. Her younger siblings were Andrew II of Hungary and Constance of Hungary. Two other siblings, Solomon and Stephen, are mentioned in the standard reference work on the genealogy of medieval European aristocracy, "Europäische Stammtafeln" (1978–1995) by Detlev Schwennicke. They reportedly died young.

Empress
In January 1185, Margaret married the Byzantine Emperor Isaac II Angelos, who wanted a politically strategic alliance with Hungary in order to strengthen his claim to the throne. Upon this marriage, Margaret took the baptismal name "Maria".

With Isaac, she had two sons:
 Manuel Angelos (died 1212), he was evidently the elder son, being contemplated in 1205 to ascend the Byzantine throne
 John Angelos (b. ca. 1193 – died 1259). He migrated to Hungary and ruled over Syrmia and Bács (1227–42) as a vassal of king Béla IV of Hungary.

Isaac had been deposed and blinded in 1195 by his brother Alexios III Angelos who then assumed the throne. Isaac was imprisoned, but it's not yet clear if Margaret was also. Her step-son Alexios IV Angelos had escaped and went to join the military discussions which were shortly to launch the Fourth Crusade. There, he and others convinced the Crusaders to attack Constantinople in order to depose his uncle and restore his imprisoned father and himself to the throne. This was done, but his restored reign was short-lived, as the Crusaders took over the empire for themselves.

Queen of Thessalonica

Margaret's husband Isaac died in February 1204, "whose end was accelerated by the fate of his son", who was "strangled in his dungeon after poison had failed to do its work". When Boniface of Montferrat, commander of the land forces at the taken of Constantinople, took the Boukoleon Palace, it was found that Margaret had taken refuge there alongside another dowager empress, the French Agnes of France. Boniface was one of only two contenders put forth to be elected emperor, but he lost to Baldwin IX, Count of Flanders. As compensation, he was granted "all the territories on the Asiatic side of the Bosphorus as well as the Ille de Griesse [the Peloponnese]." The coronation of the new emperor took place in the church of St Sophia on May 16, 1204. Later that year, in Constantinople the widowed Margaret, dowager Empress, married Boniface of Montferrat, and returned to the rites of the Latin church.

Evidently in this same year of 1204, but after his new marriage, Boniface requested that he be allowed to exchange his lands in Asia for the Kingdom of Thessalonica, which he considered to be better suited for a political alignment with his new brother-in-law Andrew, then Regent of Hungary who would then be his neighbour, and the new emperor agreed to this exchange. Boniface however did not enjoy his domains in peace, being engaged in almost constant warfare until his death. Margaret's step-daughter Agnes of Montferrat was married to the new emperor, Henry of Flanders, in February 1207. That same year, Boniface was returning to Thessalonica when he was ambushed by Bulgarians. He was taken alive and decapitated, his head being sent to Kaloyan of Bulgaria.

With Boniface, Margaret had a son:
Demetrius of Montferrat in 1207, he wed a sister of the Lord of Athens but they had no children

Regency
Boniface left a will designating Demetrius as his successor in Thessalonica under the regency of his mother. His son William of Montferrat, by an earlier marriage, succeeded to the Marquisate of Montferrat. The barons however, knowing that a strong government was necessary, constituted themselves a council of regency for the infant.

In 1207, on his father's death, Demetrius became king of Thessalonica, at least in title. The Emperor visited Thessalonica to receive the homage in the infant's name, but was barred from the city by the bailiff Biandrate until he would agree to outrageous demands. Margaret, now in the Emperor's presence, put herself in his hands and revealed the plot against the infant. The Emperor then crowned the new infant King of Thessalonica.  Margaret thereby secured the position of regent, as was stipulated in her spouse's will. 

Biandrate fled, but conspiring at a distance, returned once more in 1216 to claim the Regency. The regent Margaret asked the emperor for assistance: "In response to Queen Margaret's appeal the Emperor hurried to her assistance, but arrived on the scene only to die with mysterious suddenness in the flower of his age."

Later life
Margaret fled to Hungary apparently leaving her son Demetrius in Thessalonica.  She married thirdly Nicholas I of Saint Omer, who had accompanied his uncle on the Crusade and was granted a fief in Doris. He is also called "Lord of Boeotia".

With Nicholas, Margaret was apparently the mother of his two known sons:
 Bela of Saint Omer
 William of Saint Omer, who married but died childless.

On 30 March 1223, Pope Honorius II took Margaret under his protection, issuing a document that contains a list of her properties.

Death
Margaret was still living in 1223. Her exact death date and place, and burial location are apparently unknown.

References

Sources

 
 

1175 births
13th-century deaths
Year of death unknown
Hungarian princesses
Marchionesses of Montferrat
Angelid dynasty
Christians of the Fourth Crusade
12th-century Byzantine empresses
13th-century Byzantine empresses
12th-century Hungarian women
13th-century Hungarian women
13th-century viceregal rulers
House of Árpád
Aleramici
People of the Kingdom of Thessalonica
Remarried royal consorts
13th-century women rulers
Daughters of kings